The South Pennar River (also known as Dakshina Pinakini in Kannada and Thenpennai or Ponnaiyar or Pennaiyar in Tamil) is a river in India. Bangalore, Hosur, Tiruvannamalai, and Cuddalore are the important cities on the banks of South Pennar river. This is the second longest river in Tamil Nadu, with a length of 497km, after the Kaveri. Chandapura, Anekal, Hosur, Bagalur and Chengam are the major industrial settlements on its banks. The river is severely polluted by industrial waste as it flows through major industrial areas in the eastern suburbs of Bangalore, Industrial parks of Hosur and Chengam.

The river originates in the Nandi Hills in the Chikkaballapura district of Karnataka and flows through Tamil Nadu before emptying into the Bay of Bengal. It has a catchment area of  located in Karnataka and Tamil Nadu states. Small dams of Kelavarapalli and Krishnagiri Dams are built across this river near Hosur and Krishnagiri. The largest dam on this river, Sathanur Dam with 7.3 Tmcft Gross Capacity is built near Tiruvannamalai. Moongilthuraipattu Sugar Factory is also situated on the bank of river.

The river is dry for the most part of the year. Water flows during the monsoon season when it is fed by the south-west monsoon in catchment area and the northeast monsoon in Tamil Nadu. However this water flow raises the water table throughout the river basin and feeds numerous reservoirs/tanks.

The old river Dakshina Pinakini does not exist anymore.
Substantial part of Bangalore's sewage enters this river via Bellandur and Varthur Lakes and other channels.

The sand build of the river is quite impressive, suggesting that it may have been a perennial river with much larger water flow in the past. Mention of the river is found in Sangam and medieval (Tevaram - Bhakti cult era) literature, where it is depicted as rich with lush vegetation on its banks.  There are Famous temples on its banks like Penneswaraar Temple,Shree Venkateshwara Swamy temple, Dakshina Tirupati, Veerateshwarar Temple and Kabilar Kundru . It irrigates Chikkaballapur district, Bengaluru Rural district, Bengaluru Urban district, Kolar districtKrishnagiri district, Dharmapuri district, Tiruvannamalai, Viluppuram district and Cuddalore district. It splits into a delta on which Cuddalore town is located.

This river is now looted for its rich availability of sand. As the water flow will be only in monsoon seasons, the river is dry in remaining parts of the year.

See also 
 Arkavathy River
 Palar River
 Penneswaraar Temple

References 

Rivers of Tamil Nadu
Rivers of Karnataka
Rivers of India